Colobothea sejuncta is a species of beetle in the family Cerambycidae. It was described by Bates in 1865. It is known from Brazil, Ecuador and Peru.

References

sejuncta
Beetles described in 1865